Jennifer Klein (born June 20, 1984) is an American soccer coach who is the current head coach at Michigan.

Playing career
Klein played as a midfielder for the Arizona Wildcats from 2002 to 2005.

Coaching career

UNLV
On June 15, 2010, Klein was promoted to head coach of the UNLV women's soccer program after the departure of Kat Mertz who left for Texas.

Washington State
On March 1, 2012, Klein was named an assistant coach of the Washington State women's soccer program.

USC
On January 17, 2014, Klein was named an assistant coach of the USC Trojans women's soccer program. On May 26, 2015, Klein was promoted to associate head coach at USC.

Michigan
On February 28, 2018, Klein was named the new head coach of the Michigan Wolverines women's soccer program. On September 21, 2021, Michigan announced they extended Klein's contract through the 2025 season.

Head coaching record

College

References

1984 births
Living people
People from Prescott, Arizona
Soccer players from Arizona
American women's soccer players
Women's association football midfielders
Arizona Wildcats women's soccer players
American women's soccer coaches
Female association football managers
Arizona Wildcats women's soccer coaches
UNLV Rebels women's soccer coaches
Washington State Cougars women's soccer coaches
USC Trojans women's soccer coaches
Michigan Wolverines women's soccer coaches